Leslie Desmond Edward Foster-Vesey-Fitzgerald MBE (born 9 June 1909 in London, UK; died 3 May 1974 in Nairobi, Kenya), was an Irish-born entomologist, ornithologist, conservationist, and plant collector.

In 1930 Vesey-Fitzgerald graduated to Bachelor of Science at the Wye Agricultural College of the London University. In 1932 he became Associate of the Imperial College of Tropical Agriculture in Trinidad (AICTA). From 1933 to 1936 he conducted research work  on biological control of insect pests on sugar cane in Brazil, British Guiana and the British West Indies. From 1936 to 1939 he did research on biological control of insect pests on coconut palms in the Seychelles, Madagascar and the coastal East Africa. In 1938 he married Rosalinda Octavia Hindson. From 1939 to 1941 he was entomologist at the Rubber Research Institute in Malaya.

From 1941 to 1942 he served with the Federal Malay States Volunteers. From 1942 to 1947 he worked as entomologist at the Middle East Anti Locust Unit in Sudan, Saudi Arabia and Oman. From 1947 to 1949 he was senior assistant game warden in Kenya. From 1949 to 1964 he worked as Senior Scientific Officer at the Anti-Locust Research Centre in Abercorn, Northern Rhodesia. .

In 1964 he became an ecologist and conservationist in the National parks of Tanzania where he experimented with an electric fence in the Arusha National Park. He further went on ornithological, entomological, and botanical surveys to Kuwait, Oman, Saudi Arabia, Tanzania, Zambia, South Africa, the Mascarenes, the Seychelles, and Trinidad and Tobago. His plant collections are on display in the Natural History Museum, the Royal Botanic Gardens, Kew, the Botanische Staatssammlung Munich, the NU Herbarium, University of KwaZulu-Natal, the Muséum National d'Histoire Naturelle, and in the National Herbarium and Botanic Garden of Avondale, Harare, Zimbabwe.

Vesey-Fitzgerald's burrowing skink (Janetaescincus veseyfitzgeraldi ) from the Seychelles is named in his honour.

Selected works
1940: On the Vegetation of Seychelles
1955: The Vegetation of the Outbreak Areas of the Red Locust (Nomadacris Septemfasciata Serv.) in Tanganyika and Northern Rhodesia
1955: Vegetation of the Red Sea coast south of Jedda, Saudi-Arabia. Journal of Ecology 43:477-489
1957: The Vegetation of the Red Sea coast north of Jedda. Saudi Arabia. Journal of Ecology 45:547-562. 
1957: The vegetation of Central and Eastern Arabia. Journal of Ecology 45_779-798
1958: The Snakes of Northern Rhodesia and the Tanganyika Borderlands Brown Knight & Truscott London  
1963: Annotated List of Grasses Collected in the Congo Drainage Basin of Northern Rhodesia and Tanganyika
1963: Central African Grasslands
1973: East African Grasslands East African Pub. House

References

Further reading
Desmond, Ray  (1994). Dictionary of British and Irish Botanists and Horticulturists: Including Plant Collectors, Flower Painters, and Garden Designers. Revised and Completely Updated Edition. London: Taylor & Francis. 900 pp.

External links
Short info about Desmond Vesey-Fitzgerald
Entry for Desmond Vesey-Fitzgerald at Aluka
Entry for Vesey-Fitzgerald at the Peerage Database

1909 births
1974 deaths
Irish entomologists
Irish ornithologists
Members of the Order of the British Empire
People from Dunleer
Irish expatriates in Tanzania
20th-century British zoologists
Alumni of Wye College